Durbanville is a town in the Western Cape province of South Africa, part of the greater Cape Town metropolitan area. Durbanville is a semi-rural residential suburb on the north-eastern outskirts of the metropolis and is surrounded by farms producing wine and wheat.

History
Precolonial period (before 1652)

The first modern humans indigenous to the Cape area included the Khoina and the Khoisan tribe. The indigenous people lived in the Cape and its surrounding coastal areas dating as far back as 60 000 years ago. They migrated from the interior of the country, what is today the Northern Cape province, and from Botswana and Namibia to the Cape.

Dutch colonial period (1652-1795)

Durbanville's inception can be traced to a fresh water spring located in the town. The spring is currently situated behind the Durbanville Children's Home. The spring was designated by the VOC (Dutch East India Company, Dutch: Vereenigde Oostindische Compagnie) in the mid-1600s to be used as a water replenishment station for travelers on their way from Cape Town to the interior of southern Africa. In 1661 rhinoceros and ostrich were known to inhabit the area. Durbanville was originally known as Pampoenkraal (from the Afrikaans words pampoen meaning pumpkin, and kraal meaning corral - an enclosure for livestock). This name was attributed to the town because of a pumpkin patch which grew alongside a dam located behind the current Town Hall. Due to the natural spring, Pampoenkraal became a preferred resting place for travelers before continuing on their journey into the interior.

During the late 1600s, the VOC allocated farms to free burghers situated around the town. Some of those farms are still in existence today, many of which are renowned for their wine production. These include Bloemendal, Meerendal, Diemersdal and Altydgedacht.

British colonial period (1795-1902)

The first portions of land were earmarked as residential properties and allocated in 1806, signifying the start and development of Durbanville.

In 1825 a group of local farmers requested permission from Lord Charles Somerset (governor of the Cape Colony at that time) to build their own church. The Dutch Reformed Church was commenced in 1825 and inaugurated a year later on 6 August 1826. A small village grew between the church and the outspan (overnight stop). During 1836 the inhabitants of Pampoenkraal petitioned the Governor of the Cape Colony, Sir Benjamin d'Urban, for permission to rename the village D'Urban in his honour.  Permission was duly granted and the new name persisted until 1886 when it was renamed to Durbanville in order to avoid confusion with Durban - a major port city in the east of South Africa.

Durbanville had its own court house, jail and magistrate from the 1870s and became a Magisterial District of Bellville. The court house complex still exists in altered form within the Rust-en-Vrede complex, originally erected in 1850. A village management board was established in 1897 and a municipality in 1901. The first mayor elected was John King.

The village grew rapidly after the turn of the 19th century and a local wagon industry developed. The King Brothers Wagon Works' used to be South Africa's biggest wagon works. At the turn of the century, it employed more than 200 men, which just about accounted for the entire village.

Historical Attractions

Durbanville still retains many of its historical features and attractions such as the Rust-en-Vrede Art Gallery on Wellington Road  (built in the 1840s and was originally used as a prison and police headquarters, then a magistrate’s court), Onze Molen Wind Mill, Durbanville Synagogue, Durbanville Dutch Reformed Church and original houses on historical streets such as Church Street, Gladstone Street, Main Street, Oxford Street, Queen Street and Scher Street.

Geography

Durbanville lies in the hilly region of the Tygerberg Hills (a range of hills between Durbanville and Bellville) approximately 28 km north-east of Cape Town by road and 47 km south-west of Malmesbury by road. Organisationally and administratively it is included in the City of Cape Town Metropolitan Municipality as a Northern Suburb.

Due to the growth of Durbanville and its neighbouring towns, it has now become a de facto urban unit with Bellville, Brackenfell and Kraaifontein with Brackenfell and Kraaifontein bordering to the south-east and Bellville to the south.

Suburban Areas
Amanda Glen (Residential)
Aurora (Residential)
Avalon Estate (Residential)
Bergsig (Residential)
Brentwood Park (Residential)
Country Places (Residential)
D'urbanvale (Residential)
Durbanville Hills (Residential)
Durbell (Residential)
Durmonte (Residential)
Everglen (Residential)
Eversdal (Residential)
Eversdal Heights (Residential)
Goedemoed (Residential)
Graanendal (Residential)
Halali (Residential)
Kenridge (Residential)
Kenridge Heights (Residential)
Klein Nederburg (Residential)
Langeberg Village (Residential)
Morningstar (Residential)
Pinehurst (Residential)
Proteaville (Residential)
Rosedale (Residential)
Schoongezicht (Residential)
Sonstraal (Residential)
Sonstraal Heights (Residential)
Tara (Residential)
The Crest (Residential)
Uitzicht (Residential)
Valmary Park (Residential)
Vergesig (Residential)
Vierlanden (Residential)
Vygeboom (Residential)
Welgevonden Estate (Residential)
Wellway Park (Residential)
Wellway Park East (Residential)

Economy

Agriculture 

Despite Durbanville rapidly developing in the past two decades to acquire its suburban status, the town still largely remains a farming community with most agricultural activities involving wine production, grain and dairy production, most notably one of the Western Cape’s largest dairy producers, Fair Cape’s “Welgegund” dairy farm is located north of Durbanville along Malanshoogte Road.

Viticulture
The Durbanville Wine Valley is a collection of 13 wine farms located on the Tygerberg Hills surrounding Durbanville stretching from De Grendel and Durbanville Hills on the far west to Meerendal and Diemersdal on the far north and Groot Phesantekraal in the far north-east. The wine valley forms part of the Coastal Wine Region of the Western Cape.

Durbanville is popularly known as the "Sauvignon Blanc Country” because of the amount of sauvignon blanc produced in the wine valley. This is further due to the fact that this area is favoured by winemakers for its cooler climate (compared to further inland wine regions such as Stellenbosch) influenced by the winds of Table and False bays resulting in a different style of wine produced on the wine farms within the valley.

The wine farms around Durbanville have also turned the town into becoming an increasingly popular tourist destination within Greater Cape Town especially because of the close proximity of its wine farms to Cape Town compared to those of the Cape Winelands (Paarl, Stellenbosch and Franschhoek)

Residential Development 
Over the past two decades, a large amount of farming land in Durbanville has been lost to a growing number of new residential developments of gated communities and estates, most notably the Pinehurst Garden City on the boundary between Durbanville and Kraaifontein (Pinehurst has effectively joined Durbanville and Kraaifontein together), Clara Anna Fontein Lifestyle Estate on the northern periphery of Durbanville and Graanendal Lifestyle Estate and Village on the eastern periphery of Durbanville.

Culture
Afrikaans and English are the main languages spoken in Durbanville. In the past Afrikaans predominated culturally, but this has changed with the rapid development of the town. However the majority (59%) of the town still speaks Afrikaans as a first language. The principal religion of the population is Christianity with a wide variety of churches in the community.

Demographics
According to the 2011 Census, the population of Durbanville was 54,286. The following tables show various demographic data about Durbanville from that census.

Gender

Racial Makeup

Home Language

Education
The town has the following public high schools:
 Durbanville High School (an Afrikaans-medium school)
 Fairmont High School (an English-medium school)

There are numerous primary schools, including:
 Durbanville Preparatory
 Durbanville Primary 
 Eversdal Primary
 Gene Louw Primary
 Kenridge Primary
 The Valley Primary

The area also has a number of private schools:
 Curro Durbanville
 El Shaddai Christian School.
 Meridian Pinehurst
 Reddam House Durbanville

Healthcare 
Durbanville only has one hospital, Mediclinic Durbanville which is a private hospital on Wellington Road owned by one of South Africa's largest healthcare groups, Mediclinic International. Durbanville does have one public health facility in the town which is a public clinic near the CBD whilst the nearest public hospital is the Karl Bremer Hospital in Bellville.

Transport

Air
Cape Winelands Airport is located approximately 13 km NE of Durbanville. Located in the Western Cape winelands, Cape Winelands Airport (formerly Fisantekraal Airfield) is an ex-South African Airforce airfield now operating privately as a general flying airfield and used for aviation training. Of the four original runways, two remain operational while the other two are used for film production. It has been in private ownership since 2021. Operators at the airfield are Cape Town Flight Training Center and Aerosport Training. The Fighting on Fire organization also has a summer base at Cape Winelands Airport. The ICAO designator is FAWN. Located on a 150ha site, Cape Winelands Airport has a number of aircraft hangars for the storage and maintenance of private aircraft and helicopters.

However the nearest international airport with scheduled flights to Durbanville is the Cape Town International Airport located 19 km south-west of Durbanville by road in Matroosfontein on the Cape Flats. Cape Town International Airport offers several flights to towns and cities domestically in South Africa as well as regionally in Africa and internationally in Asia, Europe and North America.

Bus
Durbanville is serviced by the commuter bus service of Golden Arrow which services the Cape Metropole. Due to Durbanville's considerable far distance from Cape Town and other suburbs in the metropole, Durbanville is linked by several bus routes, with the most popular being the Bellville and the City (Cape Town) routes. 

Golden Arrow links Durbanville with Cape Town, Atlantis, Bellville, Bishop Lavis, Blue Downs, Delft, Fisantekraal, Hanover Park, Khayelitsha, Killarney Gardens, Langa, Mitchells Plain, Nyanga, Philippi and Scottsdene (Kraaifontein).  

Currently, Durbanville as well as the other Northern Suburbs of Cape Town are not served by the MyCiTi commuter bus service which is currently serving other suburbs nearer to Cape Town as well as Mitchells Plain and Khayelitsha.

Rail
Durbanville is one of the very few areas in the Cape Metropole that is not served by the commuter rail system of Metrorail with the nearest railway stations in the surrounding towns of Bellville, Brackenfell and Kraaifontein.

Roads
The R302 regional route serves as Durbanville’s main road, entering the town from  Bellville in the south as “Durbanville Avenue” and as it enters the town centre, it becomes “Main Road”. It turns right into the town centre to become the main street named “Wellington Road” before leaving Durbanville as “Klipheuwel Road” towards Klipheuwel (20 km) and Malmesbury (45 km) in the north. Durbanville is also indirectly connected to Fisantekraal (9 km) and Wellington (43 km) via the R312 which begins 7 km outside the town at the intersection with the R302. 

Durbanville does not have direct access to a freeway but is indirectly connected to two freeways (N1 and N7) through various arterial routes. Durbanville is connected to the N1 freeway (to Cape Town and Paarl) through the R302, M16, M31, M100, M137 and is connected to the N7 freeway (to Cape Town and Malmesbury) via the M13 and M48.

Durbanville is mostly served by a large network of metropolitan routes which link the town to nearby towns, suburbs and villages in the City of Cape Town and include the M13 (Church Street; Race Course Road) to Milnerton (20 km), M15 (Langeberg Road) to Kraaifontein, M16 (Jip de Jager Avenue) and M31 (Tygerberg Valley Road) to Bellville, M48 (Vissershok Road) to Vissershok (9 km), M58 (Koeberg Road; Adderley Road) to Philadelphia (23 km), M73 (Eversdal Road; De Bron Road) to Brackenfell and Kraaifontein, M100 (Brackenfell Boulevard) to Brackenfell and Kuilsrivier (13 km), M124 (Fairtrees Road) to Bellville and the M137 (Okavango Road) to Brackenfell.

Taxis
Durbanville is also served two kinds of taxis: metered taxis and minibus taxis. Unlike many cities and towns in South Africa, metered taxis are not allowed to drive around the town to solicit fares and instead must be called to a specific location. Metered taxi companies operating in Durbanville include Uber, Bolt, InDriver and DiDi. 

Minibus taxis are a major form of public transportation in Durbanville and the majority of minibus taxis terminate at the Durbanville Interchange/Terminus in the CBD.

Nature Reserves
There are two nature reserves in Durbanville which are the Durbanville and Uitkamp Wetland Nature Reserve. Durbanville Nature Reserve is adjacent to the racecourse and along Race Course Road (M13). Uitkamp Wetland Nature Reserve is located in D'Urbanvale, a northern suburb of Durbanville.

Notable people
 Mark Shuttleworth,  founder of Thawte and second self-funded space tourist.
 Amore Bekker, radio personality, author, MC and columnist.
 Jody Williams, winner of Idols season 4
 Daniele Pascal, French Chanteuse, Actor and Playwright, and owner of Villa Pascal Guest House (B+B) and Theatre
 Annelisa Weiland, actress. Played Hilda de Kock on popular South African soapie 7de Laan for almost 20 years.
Duane Vermeulen, rugby union player for Western Province, Stormers and the Springboks.
Jack Parow, Afrikaans rapper.
Zanne Stapelberg, international operatic soprano.

Coat of arms
The Durbanville municipal council assumed a coat of arms, designed by Ivan Mitford-Barberton and H. Ellis Tomlinson, in April 1948, and registered them at the Bureau of Heraldry in February 1981.The National Archives and Records Service of South Africa (NARSSA)

The arms, derived from those of Sir Benjamin d'Urban, were : Or, on a chevron between in chief two six-pointed stars Sable and in base a bunch of grapes proper, three garbs Or.  In layman's term, the shield is gold and depicts, from top to bottom, two black six-pointed stars, a blue chevron bearing three golden sheaves of wheat, and a bunch of grapes.

The crest was a red sphinx charged with three golden rings, and the motto Sit nomine digna.

References

Suburbs of Cape Town
Populated places established in 1825